Melisa Rollins (born November 19, 1995) is an American professional racing cyclist who placed 5th at the Unbound 200 mile gravel race in 2022. Rollins rides for UCI Women's Team . She graduated from University of Utah in 2019 with a bachelors of science in chemistry. She works as a medical laboratory technologist. She lives in Utah.

References

1995 births
American cyclists
People from Provo, Utah
Living people